Daemon and Freedom™ comprise a two-part novel by the author Daniel Suarez about a distributed, persistent computer application, the Daemon, that begins to change the real world after the original programmer's death.

 Daemon (2006)  paperback; (2009) hardcover re-release 
 Freedom™ (2010)

Plot
Upon publication of the obituary for Matthew A. Sobol, a brilliant computer programmer and CTO of Cyberstorm Entertainment, a daemon is activated. Sobol, dying of brain cancer, was fearful for humanity and began to envision a new world order. The Daemon becomes his tool to achieve that vision. The Daemon's first mission is to kill two programmers Joseph Pavlos and Chopra Singh who worked for CyberStorm Entertainment and unknowingly helped in the creation of the Daemon.

The program secretly takes over hundreds of companies and provides financial and computing resources for recruiting real world agents and creating AutoM8s (computer controlled driverless cars, used as transport and occasionally as weapons), Razorbacks (sword-wielding robotic riderless motorcycles, specifically designed as weapons) and other devices. The Daemon also creates a secondary online web service, hidden from the general public, dubbed the Darknet, which allows Daemon operatives to exchange information freely. Daemon implements a kind of government by algorithm inside the community of its recruited operatives.
 
What follows is a series of interlocking stories following the main characters:

Detective Pete Sebeck is called in to investigate the death of Pavlos. However, when a connection is made between the two programmers and Cyberstorm, the FBI takes over led by Agent Decker. For being the first authority figure in the investigation, the Daemon selects Sebeck against his will to serve the Daemon, which frames Sebeck for its creation as a multi-million scheme and a hoax. The US government, though knowing the truth, fasttracks Sebeck's trial and executes him eight months later. Sebeck makes peace with his wife, who loves him despite the fact that Sebeck is having an affair, but his son Chris remains estranged, and he proclaims his innocence while dying from lethal injection. However, Sebeck later awakens to learn that the Daemon faked his death and assigned him the task to prove that humanity deserves its freedom from the Daemon. Joined by a fellow operative named Laney Price, Sebeck vanishes into America.

Jon Ross, a Russian hacker and identity thief, is questioned by the FBI and brought into the investigation by Sebeck. Unfortunately, traditional investigation methods are useless against Sobol's Daemon program. Ross eventually deduces that the Daemon can anticipate their every move, seemingly one step ahead of anyone who tries to interfere with its operation. Even after being named in the Daemon hoax (and put on the FBI's most wanted list), Ross willingly helps the US government to stop the program. Assigned to the NSA's anti-Daemon task force, with Agent Phillips, he is a firsthand witness to Loki's attack on the installation and barely survives the massacre that follows. With his immunity deal rescinded, he vanishes underground with the intent on destroying the Daemon on his own.

Agent Roy "Tripwire" Merritt a decorated FBI agent is brought in to secure Sobol's property, when several FBI agents and police officers are killed by an automated Hummer that attacks anyone who approaches. A longtime military officer and expert in hostage situations, he realizes that Sobol's estate is a death trap and red herring, but fear of the Daemon forces his hand and his team is ordered to secure the site regardless. His team is quickly killed, and he remains the lone survivor, infiltrating the house and accidentally triggering a bomb, which levels the property. Blamed for the failure, he is relieved of duty but is later brought onto the anti-Daemon task force by the Major. When Loki is revealed to have infiltrated the building, Roy pursues him, against orders. Fearful of the publicity that the chase will generate, the Major kills Roy himself. Despite being an enemy to the Daemon, he becomes a folk hero of the Darknet, known as "The Burning Man" by the Darknet users, who respect him for his tenacity.

NSA Agent Natalie Philips, a genius workaholic government cryptographer. Phillips joins the investigation shortly after the FBI is called in. Eventually, she is placed in charge of the anti-Daemon task force, but she finds plenty of interference from the Major. She is attracted to Jon Ross (the attraction is mutual), but she quickly states that national security will take precedence and their relationship will remain professional. Phillips objects to the murder of Sebeck to protect infected corporate systems from the Daemon's wrath. One of a handful survivors from Loki's attack, Phillips is blamed for the failure and relieved of duties.

Brian Gragg aka "Loki Stormbringer" is a sociopathic loner and avid gamer. He makes a living through identity theft and other cyber crimes. After running afoul of some hackers from the Philippines, he allows his partner in crime, Jason Heider, to be killed in his place. Needing to lie low, Loki is recruited by the Daemon by outthinking a hidden game level in one of Sobol's games. Loki is the first Daemon operative and quickly becomes one of the most powerful operatives. His behavior, though useful to the Daemon, is hated and feared even by other Darknet members. His first major act is to infiltrate the anti-Daemon task force. When found out, he quickly triggers an attack, which leaves most of the people and agents there dead. He is pursued by Roy Merritt, as he escapes and witnesses the Major executing Roy, vowing to kill the Major for betraying his own man.

The Major, unnamed throughout the series, is introduced as a secret DOD liaison assigned to the daemon task force. Soon, everyone who encounters him realizes that his history is checkered, and his loyalty remains with the military-industrial complex now under attack by the Daemon. When Loki massacres the task force, he quickly contains the situation by destroying all evidence (including leveling the building) and personally executing Roy Merritt, fearful that Merritt's pursuit of Loki will attract too much attention. Realizing that they have underestimated the Daemon and its network, the Major retreats and prepares to wage a secret war against the Daemon and its agents.

Anji Anderson is a recently fired reporter, whose good looks have hindered her career for years. Having been relegated to fluff pieces and put on the air to be pretty, she is quickly recruited as a Daemon operative, her job to investigate stories that benefit the Daemon and help push its propaganda. Her main effect in the story is to help frame Sebeck.  She eventually becomes the spokesman for the Daemon.

Charles Mosely is a former drug dealer and convicted killer recruited by the Daemon, which helps him to escape prison by transferring him first to minimum security and then releasing him altogether. With a new identity, he travels to a Daemon-controlled office where he is interrogated by the Daemon's AI and is deemed acceptable to serve. He eventually becomes a security operative, assigned jobs such as executing criminals, participating a massive worldwide assassination of spammers who corrupt the internet. Mosley's only request is for the Daemon to locate his missing son and protect him. Ray is both found and sent to live with Daemon agents, who will raise and educate Ray in a safe family-like setting.

Dutton purchase
On June 25, 2008, the Dutton imprint of the Penguin Group purchased Daemon and the rights to the sequel Freedom™ from Verdugo Press.

Film adaptation
Walter F. Parkes, who produced the 1983 film WarGames, had optioned the film rights to Daemon with Paramount Pictures, but they likely reverted to Suarez on 8 December 2012.

References

External links

 Insightful interview with Daniel Suarez, titled  "Understanding the Daemon"
 Novels' website
 An interview with Daniel Suarez on the BookBanter podcast
 Review of both Daemon and Freedom™ by political theorist Kevin Carson.
 Joi Ito's Review of Daemon
 Daemons: IT Keepsakes; Jim Rapoza, eWeek
 A Book Review: Don Donzal, Editor-in-Chief, The Ethical Hacker Network

2006 American novels
Techno-thriller novels
Novels about computing
2000s science fiction novels
American science fiction novels
Novels about the Internet
Transhumanist books
Postcyberpunk novels
Mixed reality
Fictional software
Malware in fiction
Cybernetted society in fiction
Hive minds in fiction
Massively multiplayer online role-playing games in fiction
Novels about death
Detective novels
Fiction about parasites
Novels about cryptography
Novels about mass surveillance
Utopian fiction
Government by algorithm in fiction
Social reputation in fiction